Flora Elizabeth Burchenal (October 18, 1875 – November 21, 1959) was an American folk dance educator. She was a teacher of dance in the New York state public school system as well as an inspector of athletics for the New York Department of Education. Burchenal influenced the cultural conduct of recreational life in the United States, Canada and Europe.

Early life 

Burchenal was born on October 18, 1875, in Richmond, Indiana to Charles Henry Burchenal and his second wife, Mary Elizabeth Day.  Her father was a Quaker, and a prominent attorney born in Maryland. His first wife, Ellen, who was born in Ireland, died in 1864, around age 30.

Flora was her given name and later she took on the name Elizabeth (her middle name). Burchenal pronounced her family name "Burchenélle" as was the tradition. "Burchenal" shows up as being anglicized to "Brockend" in the 1880 United States Census. Burchenal was the second oldest child in the family of four girls and one boy. Her childhood folk dance career came from a "musically gifted family circle passing many an hour dancing and singing songs of the old country." She was influenced early in her life towards folk dance by her musician mother who took her on travels to remote mountain cabins by horseback, where she picked up folk dance techniques of the remote mountain village people. Her father was especially interested in folklore.

Burchenal attended Earlham College and graduated in 1896 with a Bachelor of Arts degree in English. She then went to Boston University Sargent College, school of physical training. She graduated from Sargent College in 1898. Then after graduation she directed in the department of orthopedics the Medical Gymnasium, which later became Boston Children's Hospital Medical Center. She directed physical education programs from 1898 to 1902 in Boston as well as Chicago.

Mid life 

Burchenal became interested in using dance in physical education and was influenced by the dance educator Melvin Gilbert. She carried his philosophy of dance education to Columbia University. She thought that Gilbert's dance techniques should be taught at the University in their physical training classes.

Burchenal became a teacher at Teachers College, Columbia University from 1902 to 1905. Here she began her researching of folk dancing not only in the United States, but also the dancing techniques of Canadian and European folk dancers. Beginning in 1904 she traveled around the world gathering folk dance techniques of various countries. 

Burchenal was next persuaded by the director of New York physical education, Luther Gulick, to become a teacher of dance in the state public school system. In this role she excelled and gained higher levels of authority. She became the executive secretary of the Girl's Branch of the New York Public Schools Athletic League from 1905 to 1916. There she taught teachers folk dancing besides teaching her normal athletics. She then obtain an additional job as the inspector of athletics for the New York Department of Education from 1909 to 1916. She influenced the nation into introducing folk dancing into the public schools' physical education programs throughout the United States. In addition she organized large gatherings for folk dance festivals, one in particular being a celebration at a New York borough park which involved 10,000 schoolgirls.

In 1913, Lady Aberdeen was so impressed by seeing a group of 2000 Burchenal trained girls folk dancing in a Manhattan public school that she persuaded Burchenal to teach a collection of teachers in Ireland about folk dancing. Before the year was out, Irish national folk dances were a part of the standard physical educational school classes.

Burchenal did traveling around the United States, Europe, and Canada to not only train teachers the techniques of folk dancing, but also took this traveling opportunity to learn more dances. Often she would take her younger sister who played the piano for the dancing. She influenced the social and cultural conduct of recreational life not only in the United States, but also in Canada and Europe. Burchenal described folk dancing as one of the few times that people of different nationalities and cultures can get together in a common event.

The passenger list of the ship Minnetonka shows Burchenal traveling from London and arriving in New York City November 12, 1928. At that time she listed her address as 2700 Broadway in New York City. She was traveling with her older sister Ruth.

Later life and death 
In 1929 she founded the National Committee of Folk Arts. The American Folk Dance Society, that she had previously founded, became a part of this larger organization. Burchenal directed the Folk Arts Center in New York City, which had a museum and a library on national dance information.  At various international folk dance festivals Burchenal represented the United States. 
Oberlaender Trust of the Carl Schurs Memorial Foundation granted her a research fellowship for 1933 and 1934 to study folk dance techniques in Germany. She was chairperson on several dance related national and international committees and organizations.The 1940 U.S. Census shows her occupation as a writer and living in New York City. Burchenal's New York death record shows she died November 21, 1959.

Awards 
Burchenal received many honors and awards. Some of the notable ones are:

 1930 - Elected into the National Academy of Kinesiology (née American Academy of Physical Education) as Fellow #28.
 1943 – honorary degree by Boston University for Doctor of Science in Physical Education.
 1950 – Luther Gulick Award for highly regarded service in physical education, the highest award in the field.

Legacy 
Burchenal became known as America's leading authority on folk dancing. She, along with her older sister Ruth, in 1916 were the organizers of the American Folk Dance Society. She also founded the Archive of American Folk Dance.

Works 
Burchenal wrote over fifteen music and dance related books. These books became reference sources in the field of folk dancing for decades. Below are some of her works:

  Official handbook for the Girls' branch of the Public schools athletic league of the city of New York  (1908)
 Folk-dances and singing games  (1909)
  Athletics for Girls  (1909)
  Folk-dances of Finland (1915)
  Handbook for the Girls' branch of the Public schools athletic league of the city of New York  (1915)
 American Folk-dances  (1917)
 Folk Dancing as a Social Recreation for Adults  (1920)
  Folk-dancing as a popular recreation  (1922)
 Folk Dances from Old Homelands  (1922)
 Rinnce Na Eirann: National Dances of Ireland  (1924)
 Folk-dances of Germany (1938)

Further reading 
 The Society of Folk Dance Historians

Notes

References

External links
 Elizabeth Burchenal recordings at the Discography of American Historical Recordings.

Bibliography 

Folk dancers
Dance in the United States
Dance education
Dance writers
Writers from Richmond, Indiana
Writers from Brooklyn
Earlham College alumni
Boston University College of Health and Rehabilitation Sciences (Sargent College) alumni
Columbia University faculty
Teachers College, Columbia University faculty
1875 births
1959 deaths